The Kochuveli–Indore Weekly Express(Via Konkan) is a weekly express train of the Indian Railways,running between Kochuveli railway station of Thiruvananthapuram, the capital city of Kerala and Indore Junction BG railway station of Indore, the largest city and commercial capital of Madhya Pradesh.  It is currently being operated with 20931/20932 train numbers on a weekly basis.

Coach composition

The train has standard LHB rakes with max speed of 130 km/h. The train consists of 20 coaches:

 2 AC II Tier
 5 AC III Tier
 8 Sleeper class
 4 General Unreserved
 1 Pantry car
 2 End On Generator

Service

20931/Kochuveli–Indore Weekly Express has an average speed of 51 km/hr and covers 2287 km in 45 hrs 15 mins.
20932/Indore–Kochuveli Weekly Express has an average speed of 50 km/hr and covers 2287 km in 45 hrs 40 mins.

Route and halts 

The important halts of the train are:

Schedule

Traction

Both trains are hauled by a Ratlam Diesel Loco Shed-based twin WDM-3A or WDM-3D diesel locomotive from Kochuveli to Indore and vice versa.

See also

 Konkan Railways
 Ahilyanagari Express
 Kochuveli railway station

Notes

References

External links 

 19331/Kochuveli–Indore Weekly Express India Rail Info
 19332/Indore–Kochuveli Weekly Express India Rail Info

Express trains in India
Transport in Indore
Transport in Thiruvananthapuram
Rail transport in Madhya Pradesh
Rail transport in Kerala
Rail transport in Maharashtra
Rail transport in Goa
Rail transport in Gujarat
Rail transport in Karnataka
Railway services introduced in 2016